Teresa Ripoll Sabate (born 3 February 1997) is a Spanish professional racing cyclist, who currently rides for UCI Women's Continental Team .

See also
 List of 2016 UCI Women's Teams and riders

References

External links
 

1997 births
Living people
Spanish female cyclists
People from Vall d'Albaida
Sportspeople from the Province of Valencia
Cyclists from the Valencian Community
21st-century Spanish women